Nordam, or NORDAM, is an American aerospace company.

History 
Nordam was founded in 1969 by Raymond Siegfried.

President and CEO Charles B. Ryan was killed in a plane crash in 2001.

In 2018 Nordam filed for bankruptcy.

In 2018 Nordam halted production of nacelles for the Pratt & Whitney Canada PW800 due to a contract dispute with Pratt & Whitney Canada. In order to recover its financial position Nordam sold its nacelles business to Gulfstream Aerospace.

In 2019 Nordam exited bankruptcy through a cash injection from The Carlyle Group which resulted in Carlyle gaining control of 45% of the company.

Operations 
In 2019 Nordam had 1,800 employees in the Tulsa area and 500 elsewhere.

In 2022 Nordam opened a major MRO facility at Taoyuan which will serve as their regional hub replacing operations in Singapore. The Taoyuan operation is a joint venture with China Airlines.

References 

Manufacturing companies established in 1969
Multinational companies headquartered in the United States
The Carlyle Group
Tulsa, Oklahoma